Anne Robertson may refer to:

Anne Strachan Robertson (1910–1997), Scottish archaeologist, numismatist and writer
Anne Isabella Robertson (c. 1830 – 1910), writer and suffragist
Anne Charlotte Robertson, American filmmaker
Anne Robertson, Australian reality-TV participant